The Riverland wine region is an Australian geographical indication roughly corresponding to the Riverland tourism region in South Australia. It is the only region currently identified in the Lower Murray zone and does not have any defined subregions. The region roughly corresponds to the river flats and irrigated lands along the Murray River from just below where it flows into South Australia downstream to Blanchetown.

See also
South Australian wine

References

Wine regions of South Australia